NGC 2202 is an open cluster in the constellation Orion. The object was discovered in 1825 by the German-Russian astronomer Friedrich Georg Wilhelm von Struve.

See also 
 List of NGC objects (2001–3000)

References

External links 
 

2202
Orion (constellation)
Open clusters